is a 1956 black-and-white Japanese film directed by .

Cast 
Hiroshi Nawa : Tsuruta Mitsuo
Yujiro Ishihara : Fuyu
Kaku Takashina : Tetsu

References 

Japanese black-and-white films
1956 films
Nikkatsu films
1950s Japanese films